Super Dave (also known as The Super Dave Osborne Show) is a variety show starring and hosted by the fictional character Super Dave Osborne (played by Bob Einstein). It ran from 1987 to 1991 on Showtime in the United States and the Global Television Network in Canada. The show currently airs reruns on Adult Swim in Canada.

The character made his first appearance on the 1972 TV series The John Byner Comedy Hour. Einstein then regularly played the character on the short-lived 1976 variety series Van Dyke and Company, starring Dick Van Dyke.

Einstein revived the character for the 1980–1986 sketch comedy series Bizarre, which spun off his own series in 1987. After the last season, Einstein won a 1992 CableAce Award for Best Actor in a Comedy Series.

An animated spinoff, Super Dave: Daredevil for Hire, aired for one season on Fox TV from 1992 to 1993.

The show
Super Dave was first produced in a studio theatre at CTV television headquarters at CFTO-TV in Toronto with a live audience. The stage featured his signature "bulb wall" - a movable wall lined with red, white and blue light bulbs, which would act as a curtain. He would often do an introductory monologue, and introduce guest performers there. The studio was located at the fictional "Super Dave Compound" – a combination resort/theme park/learning center/etc. (anything which would be required for any particular episode). In the first season, in 1987, the compound was often referred to as the "stunt compound" or "Super Dave Complex".

In the second season, the show moved to a different location, the Markham Theatre, which featured the same stage setup - the bulb wall and the billboard sign behind it; however, the studio was much larger.

In the original studio, the stage was at the lowest point in the studio and was surrounded by a semicircle of bleacher-style seats (It was the same studio where the popular comedy program Bizarre with John Byner was taped, the Glen Warren Studios at CFTO-TV in the Toronto suburb of Scarborough.). The new studio was a typical theater with a raised stage, a balcony of seating and private boxes. This was the Markham Theatre in Markham, Ontario.

Super Dave's personal "racetrack" (where he drove a "specialized" race car and crashed) was actually the Riverside International Raceway in Moreno Valley, California, and you can see the name Riverside International Raceway and Winston Western 500 on the wall at turn 9.

A typical episode consisted of a teaser scene of Super Dave outside the studio, often somewhere else within his compound; his theme and introduction in the studio, usually featuring one or more artistic performances; followed by another remote scene, usually a stunt.

Besides simply bringing performers onstage normally, a false reason was often given for the performer's appearance - for instance, they might be introduced as a member of the show or compound's staff that Super Dave would allow to perform, or an audience member who suddenly revealed a talent. When a performer was introduced with such a fake background story, Super Dave would often go to thank the performer after a short simple performance, only to have them continue with a more elaborate performance before he could do so; this would repeat several times.

Super Dave's signature was to perform outrageous daredevil stunts which invariably went awry and resulted in a number of grievous injuries - usually at the end of each episode. These included such things as riding inside the hub of a giant yo-yo suspended from a crane (the yo-yo broke free of its string, rolled down a long incline, then off a cliff into a ravine hundreds of feet below) and being flung inside a giant football (the catapult which malfunctioned and "spiked" the football into the platform it was attached to instead of throwing it for distance). After an injury occurred, Super Dave would usually appear torn apart, flattened, stretched, or otherwise injured. One of his signature logos is a drawing of his head (in a helmet or his baseball cap) on top of a pair of crushed silver boots with no body. This was occasionally how he appeared after a stunt resulted in something falling on top of him.

The compound concept was explored as the seasons went on, and he would increasingly forgo a stunt in order to demonstrate a new feature of the compound, or a new piece of technology they were working on at the compound. These demonstrations would usually have the same results as his stunts, and he would be injured. Sometimes he planned to go to a stunt, but ran out of time, and would be injured in some other way. There were rare episodes in which he had been injured before the show began, and was already in the hospital, or in which he was not injured at all.

Musical guests on the show included young drummer Jacob Armen, Banig (Josephine Roberto), Veronique Beliveau, Sonny Bono, Liona Boyd, Glen Campbell, Kim Carnes, Ray Charles, Celine Dion, Thelma Houston, Colin James, k.d. lang, Jerry Lee Lewis, Melissa Manchester, Loreena McKennitt, Bill Medley, Bobby McFerrin, Kenny Rogers, Michelle Wright, Lori Yates, along with musical groups like En Vogue, and Canadian Blue Rodeo, Doug and The Slugs, The Nylons, and The Razorbacks. 

Some of the other performers who were featured included classical comedic pianist Mitchell Zeidwig, stuntman Robbie Knievel, ventriloquist Willie Tyler and Lester, ventriloquist Ronn Lucas, ventriloquist Jeff Dunham, sports broadcaster Roy Firestone, juggler Robert Gruenberg, comedic juggler Edward Jackman, talk show interviewer Larry King, juggler Michel Lauziere, tap dancer Savion Glover, impressionist André-Philippe Gagnon, boxer Evander Holyfield, comedian Steve Allen, comic Jenny Jones, talk show host Regis Philbin and the Smothers Brothers, whose variety show Einstein got his start writing for.

Recurring characters
Super Dave was accompanied by several recurring characters including:
 Mike Walden, Super Dave's announcer, whose loud suits were frequently the subject of mockery. He was almost always present in the remote segments. Walden would often say "Get that thing out of here!" after a failed stunt using dangerous machinery.
 Fuji Hakayito (Art Irizawa), Super Dave's barely comprehensible stunt coordinator.
 Donald Glanz (Don Lake), the manager of the Super Dave Compound. 
 A Trinidadian steel drum band led by Pan Man (Pat McNeilly) that only knew how to play Barry Manilow's song "Copacabana". They were always sent as a replacement for The Super Dave Band, who were unable to appear on the show when scheduled, usually due to a bar mitzvah (making them unseen characters). The Super Dave Band reportedly had a vast repertoire, which was featured in a game where audience members would try to stump the band by naming songs they would have to play. The steel drum band's leader would confirm they knew the song, but then play "Copacabana", frustrating Super Dave. A similar bit was "Name That Song", where the audience members would have to name a song played by the band.
 Michel Lauzière, a supposed backstage worker who often came on to the stage unannounced to do an interesting performance or magic trick, much to the chagrin of Super Dave. After being told not to come back until he had something "unique", he would usually return seconds later with a different trick.
 Robert Gruenberg, an unfortunate resident of the "Super Dave Confidence Building Area", where subjects are interred in underground chambers to overcome their fears. He is afraid to juggle bowling pins due to stage fright, but amazingly is able to juggle more dangerous items such as chainsaws, machetes and bowling balls at once. After he does so, he sadly states he still cannot juggle bowling pins, which leads to him being locked up again back underground.
 Bernie Weinthal, Super Dave's midget attorney, who in actual fact was a longtime bellman at the Royal York Hotel in Toronto, Ontario, Canada.
 Tony Cox, the president of the network, who always ended up getting Super Dave irritated somehow.
 Danny Menendez, a seldom seen camera man who is often mentioned by Super Dave.

Running gags
 An early joke, which appears to have been abandoned in the first season, was where Mike Walden mispronounced Fuji's surname differently every time he mentioned him. As a later gag, Walden is unable to understand Fuji's explanations of stunts, though, despite his heavy accent, the explanations are quite understandable.
 Mike Walden would often comment that safety equipment included "genuine Saskatchewan seal skin bindings" (even though Saskatchewan is completely landlocked).
 The stunts/injuries were usually done with the use of dummies, and Super Dave would often do overdubs both during and after the stunt.
 Super Dave would often ask for help, requests which Mike, Donald, and Fuji usually ignored or misunderstood, and leave him alone injured. If they did realize he was hurt, their attempts to help him would usually result in further injury.
 Super Dave would often overdub a "goodnight" speech while waiting injured.
 Super Dave would often comment on his associates' incompetence; he would often refer to Mike Walden as a "putz". Every now and then, he would swear, but it was always bleeped out with a duck's quack or a horn honk, both from Bizarre.
 Super Dave did utter "Holy Chim" in reaction to sudden pain from stunts starting to go wrong, like his barefoot firewalking stunt, which he collapsed at the end of, after yelling "Holy S<bleep>"
 Scenes would often continue after the characters believed the cameras were turned off.
 Super Dave would often be hit or run over by a vehicle, even when the sequence had nothing to do with them, and often including ambulances after he had already been hurt.
 Some of Super Dave's common catchphrases on the show included noting that something great would "knock your socks off", and exclaiming "new pain!" or "no pain!"  when he was being injured.
 Super Dave was often portrayed as self-serving, especially in scenes where he believed he was off-camera.
 The show was often said to be running late, and Super Dave would often chide people for wasting time.
 When naming famous people or other two-word proper names, Super Dave often would mistake one of the names and is corrected by Mike or someone near him, though he seems not to notice. For example, "tennis great Johnny Connors", corrected quickly by Mike Walden to "Jimmy".
 Super Dave was often presented with honors and awards, and then reminded his staff that he did not like to be embarrassed by doing so on the air. He would often receive a trophy, say how much it meant to him, then casually toss it away behind him.
 Super Dave would usually arrive at his stunt and tour segments in a vehicle, often with Donald or Fuji, to a waiting Mike Walden. He would sometimes arrive in unique vehicles including a personal hovercraft and an amphibious car.
 Super Dave would often respond to critics in a disreputable or trashy news source; he would often reveal the name of the source, a reputable source such as 60 Minutes.
 Many Super Dave commercial products were shown, and some were shown to have inflated prices.
 Other services at the Super Dave Compound were shown to have inflated prices.
 He would often invite audience members to participate in contests where they would be winning until the last question, and then be faced with an impossible final requirement, and lose a big prize in favor of Super Dave hats and shirts.
 If Fuji was being exceptionally annoying, Super Dave would usually hand Fuji a small dumbbell, asking him "Here, hold this". Upon grabbing the dumbbell, Fuji would promptly fall to the floor due to its weight.
 Donald frequently stated as to be celebrating a special event in his life, be it a promotion, a special award, or the birth of one of his children all of whom had at least one odd given  name.

On-air promotion
Weekly 30-second promos were produced by Showtime Networks to promote the series. The announcer was Doug Jeffers, who abandoned his typical breathy relaxed style for one that was more ringmaster-like in tone and emphasis. The music bed for each promo was a generic track called "Circus, Circus, Circus". The producer of the bulk of these promos was Steve Kolodny, who was given a yearly appearance on the show as "a film student who has produced a Super Dave music video".

Syndication
Reruns started airing on Comedy Gold on September 6, 2011. The show was dropped from its schedule in September 2015.

It is currently rerunning on Adult Swim since October 11, 2021.

References

External links
 

1987 American television series debuts
1991 American television series endings
1987 Canadian television series debuts
1992 Canadian television series endings
1980s American sketch comedy television series
1990s American sketch comedy television series
1980s American variety television series
1990s American variety television series
1980s Canadian variety television series
1990s Canadian variety television series
English-language television shows
Global Television Network original programming
Showtime (TV network) original programming
American television spin-offs
Canadian television spin-offs
Television shows filmed in Toronto
Television series by Corus Entertainment
1980s Canadian sketch comedy television series
1990s Canadian sketch comedy television series